Scott Steinert (1962 – 4 November 1997) was an American outlaw biker and gangster who was a member of the Hells Angels Motorcycle Club in Montreal, Quebec, Canada. He is generally regarded as the man who killed a 11-year boy, Daniel Desrochers, with a car bomb on 9 August 1995 during the Hells Angels' war against the Rock Machine.

Early life
Steinert was born in Beloit, Wisconsin into an upper middle-class family. Steinert's father was a senior executive with the Beloit Corporation and in 1970 he was appointed to a position with the Montreal office of the corporation. Steinert spent the rest of his youth growing up in Montreal. Fluently bilingual in both French and English, Steinert was described by the journalist Jerry Langton as being "utterly charming" when he wanted to be. Steinert had an exceptionally long criminal record with numerous convictions for assault, uttering death threats and narcotics possession.

Hells Angel
In the early 1990s, Steinert joined the Hells Angels Montreal chapter, being sponsored by Robert "Ti-Maigre" Richard, one of the most famous Hells Angels in Quebec, who played a prominent role in the Lennoxville massacre of 1985. Like many biker nicknames, Richard's nickname of ti-maigre ("tiny") was meant to be ironic as Richard was a gigantic man with only one eye. Detective Benoit Roberge of the Service de police de la Ville de Montréal stated: "Steinert started off low, but he gained a lot of power as he got heavily involved in the biker war". It was Steinert who first recruited Dany Kane-who later became the most important police informer within the Hells Angels-into one of their puppet clubs. Kane reported in 1994 that Steinert had a "star quality", and he thought that Steinert, who already risen up to a "prospect" (the secondary level in an outlaw biker club), would be a "full patch" member within a year or so. Steinert had become the leading rival to the Hells Angels national president, Walter "Nurget" Stadnick, and made no secret of his belief that he would be a better national president. Steinert mocked Stadnick for the failure of the Demon Keepers puppet club of 1994, and, reflecting Stadnick's damaged status, Stadnick's bodyguard, Donald "Bam Bam" Magnussen switched over to serving as Steinert's bodyguard. 

Kane reported in November 1994 that Steinert had become the right-hand man to Maurice "Mom" Boucher and was buying up C-4 explosives to make bombs. Kane reported that Steinert had purchased twenty pounds of C4 explosives and had assembed a team of bomb-makers led by Patrick Lambert. Kane described Steinert as being a very aggressive bully who was completely ruthless in his willingness to win the Quebec biker war for the Hells Angels. In another report to his police handlers in November 1994, Kane stated; "Mom Boucher hands out the execution orders for the current war with the Rock Machine. Steinert is the executioner". Kane stated to his police handlers that Steinert planned to move to Ontario once he received a "full patch" to start the first Hells Angels chapter in that province.

Kane's reports to his RCMP handlers stressed that Steinert had a most belligerent and unpleasant personality. Steinert served as Boucher's favorite Hells Angel as he made more money than any of the other Angels in Montreal. Steinert often mocked his rival David "Wolf" Carroll-whose personality was much like his own-boasting that he made more money than him, and Kane reported that the two men hated each other. The journalists Julien Sher and William Marsden wrote the feud between Carroll and Steinert was like "the twisting schemes of ambitious and sometimes psychotic medieval princes". The Canadian criminologist Steven Schnedier wrote that Steinert was an ambitious psychopath who was one of the most dangerous men in the Hells Angels. Steinert was in charge of building bombs, personally murdered members of the Rock Machine and had purchased aerial photographs of Montreal to better help plan his assassinations. Kane reported that Steinert was supplying strippers all over Canada and the West Indies. Kane reported that the attractive French-Canadian strippers he was recruiting had attracted the attention of the New York Mafia and that a Mafia "soldier" from New York had contacted Steinert to recruit strippers for a Mafia-owned club in the Dominican Republic. Kane stated that the resort which included a number of condos and a marina was a front for money laundering. Kane concluded his report that Steinert was willing to recruit strippers, but only for a cut of the profits from the club, which he used as an example of Steinert's audacity and greed as he did not defer to the Mafia at all. 

In January 1995, Kane reported that Steinert was driving around Montreal looking for the Rock Machine leader Paul "Sasquatch" Porter with the aim of killing him. The same month, Kane reported that Steinert was involved in a murder attempt against another Rock Machine member, André "Curly" Sauvageau, leading to a wild car chase down Highway 40. By early 1995, Steinert founded a gang within the gang which he named the groupe de cinq ("group of five"), which started to take over the bars on Montreal's Crescent Street and on York Street in Ottawa, both of which were the territories of his rival Carroll. At the same time, Steinert started to sell drugs in Toronto, Kingston, and Winnipeg. A very ambitious man, Steinert founded a stripper agency, Sensation, which completed with the Aventure stripper agency, which was owned by Carroll. Sher and Marsden wrote that Steinert "was a strong money-maker, boldly shipping large quantities of cocaine and hash through the Hells' Canadian network...Steinert was the bolder-or simply-crazier personality [than Carroll]. He was a killer and cared nothing for the privileges of rank if they got in the way of his ambitions". Unlike Carroll, Steinert went to bed early to start work promptly in the morning, which endeared him to Boucher, who respected Steinert for his work ethic and ability to make consistently large profits. In March 1995, when Carroll ordered Kane to drive him to Halifax, Steinert refused to allow it, which almost caused a brawl between the two men.

In 1995, Kane reported that Steinert was still an American citizen, leading for the Canadian government to issue a deportation order against him. Boucher suggested to Steinert that if he was deported, he could buy Mexican citizenship for only $30,000 U.S. dollars. According to Kane, Boucher and Steinert had developed plan to win over public opinion by killing one of their own in an especially brutal manner out of the hope that the public would blame the Rock Machine and decided that Marc Dubé – who was a low-level drug dealer working for the Angels – would be the one to be sacrificed. Kane reported that Steinert had ordered remote-controlled bombs from the bomb-maker Patrick Lambert in early August 1995. Kane stated: "Steinert was really excited and bragging that he was really going to do something that would be 'rock 'n' roll'". On 9 August 1995, Dubé was killed by a remote-controlled bomb planted in his jeep while a 11-year old boy, Daniel Desrochers, playing across the street was killed by a flying shrapnel from the bomb. Commander André Bouchard of the Montreal police stated: "I'm convinced today that the person who pressed the button to have the bomb explode saw children across the street. There was no way he could not see the children across the street".

A Royal Canadian Mounted Police (RCMP) report described Steinert as "a very violent and cruel psychopath who can't control himself", concluding he was the prime suspect for the bombing. The RCMP stated that the fact that whoever controlled the bomb that killed Dubé was aware that there were children playing across the street fitted in with what was known of Steinert's character and with what Kane had reported. Kane reported that the normally talkative Steinert was unusually quiet after the bombing and that: "since that day, Steinert no longer talked about the bombs he had ordered and never again spoke about using bombs. Steinert asked some of his crew what they thought of the bombing...When told they thought the murderer should be liquidated, Steinert didn't respond and became very pensive". 

After getting over a fright caused by the killing of Desrochers, Steinert was in a cheerful mood, receiving the "Filthy Few" special patch made up of the SS lightning bolt runes in March 1996 that are awarded to those who killed for the Angels, and a "full patch" at the same time. Steinert was the biggest pimp in Montreal, owning the Sensations escort service, whose office in Montreal was destroyed in a case of arson in August 1996 by the Rock Machine. The vast majority of strippers in Canada come from Quebec. Steinert's Sensations stripper and escort agency became the largest supplier of French-Canadian strippers in the cities and towns of northern Ontario, who also served as his spies, reporting to Montreal about the local criminals who spent their free time drinking in the bars of northern Ontario. Steinert used the information from his stripper spies to send out representatives to contract the local criminal element to assess their abilities. Langton wrote: "If he [the criminal] met their standards, the Hells Angels would start supplying him with drugs. In a very brief period of time, towns that had never seen the like before were full of Hells Angels-supplied strippers, escorts and drugs".

Steinert was a friend of Paolo "Paul" Cotroni, son of Cotroni crime family boss Frank Cotroni. Cotroni was ultimately killed by the Rock Machine on 24 August 1998 due to his association with the Hells Angels.

Murder
By 1996, the Hells Angels became divided into two factions, with one loyal to Steinert and another loyal to Stadnick and Carroll. In October 1996, Steinert formalized his "group of five" as an official group within the Hells Angels that sought to challenge the elite Nomad chapter. The "group of five" were Steinert, Magnussen, Marc Sigman, Michel Lajoie Smith, and Normand Labelle. To join the "group of five", Steinert demanded that members pay a fee of $100, 000 dollars, which deterred many Angels from joining. At the same time, Steinert purchased the ornate 17-bedroom mansion once owned by the Lavigueur family located on the ultra-wealthy island suburb of Ile aux Pruches. In November 1996, Steinert received his deportation order, which he managed to void by marrying a Canadian woman. Steinert had also fathered a child by his bride, which his lawyers used to argue that it would be inhumane to send him back to the United States. Besides the marriage ceremony at the Lavigueur mansion, Steinert also used the Lavigueur mansion to make in the summer of 1997 a pornographic film entitled The Babe Angel, starring himself, his wife and 9 of his prostitutes. 

Carroll accused Steinert and Magnussen of being police informers, noting that the Crown was completely unsuccessful in its efforts to deport Steinert back to the United States, which led him to the conclusion that Steinert must have been working for the police. Kane, who was anxious to distract attention from himself, strongly encouraged Carroll along this line of thinking, saying Steinert must be a police informer inside the Angels. Contributing to suspicions about Steinert and Magnussen was the interception of a shipment containing 31 kilograms of marijuana and 200 ecstasy pills sent by the duo to be sold to drug dealers in northern Ontario. While the RCMP was tipped off by Kane, he accused Steinert and Magnussen to Carroll of being behind the drug seizure. 

Steinert and Magnussen were last seen alive on 4 November 1997, leaving the Lavigueur mansion to see Boucher. According to testimony from Sylvain Boulanger, a member of the Sherbrooke Hells Angels chapter who turned Crown witness, Steinert was returning from his honeymoon when he was summoned to a "fake meeting" at the Sorel chapter clubhouse. Boulanger testified: "They killed Scott with a hammer. They smashed his skull. After that, they threw him into the river". The bodies of Steinert and Magnussen were later found floating in the St. Lawrence River, with their hands tied behind their backs and their heads beaten to a bloody mush, showing wounds from repeated blows from baseball bats and hammers. Sher and Mardsen wrote the killers of Steinert and Magnussen were "likely the Nomads". Magnussen's corpse was discovered floating in the St. Lawrence in May 1998 while Steinert's corpse was discovered on 15 April 1999.

Books

.

References

1962 births
1997 deaths
1997 murders in Canada
20th-century American criminals
American male criminals
American gangsters
American drug traffickers
American pimps
American expatriates in Canada
People from Beloit, Wisconsin
Criminals from Montreal
Organized crime in Montreal
People murdered by Canadian organized crime
People murdered in Quebec
Deaths by beating
Unsolved murders in Canada
Hells Angels